Velarde Club de Fútbol is a football team based in Muriedas, Camargo in the autonomous community of Cantabria, Spain. Founded in 1967, the team plays in Regional Preferente. The club's home ground is La Maruca, which has a capacity of 2,350 spectators.

History
In the 2015–16 season the club managed to promote to Tercera División by finishing 3rd in the Regional Preferente. In the 2018-19 season the club was relegated from Tercera División to the regional category Preferente Cantabria.

Season to season

20 seasons in Tercera División

References

External links
Regional Preferente
Unofficial website
Unofficial website

Football clubs in Cantabria
Association football clubs established in 1967
Divisiones Regionales de Fútbol clubs
1967 establishments in Spain